Labelle  was a federal electoral district in Quebec, Canada, that was represented in the House of Commons of Canada from 1896 to 1988.

This riding was created in 1892 from parts of the County of Ottawa riding.

The electoral district was abolished in 1987 when it was redistributed into the new riding of Laurentides and the existing riding of Pontiac—Gatineau—Labelle.

The district's most prominent MP was Quebec nationalist Henri Bourassa.

Members of Parliament

This riding elected the following Members of Parliament:

Election results

|Protectionist
|Joseph-Édouard Moranville
|align=right|129

See also 

 List of Canadian federal electoral districts
 Past Canadian electoral districts

External links
Riding history from the Library of Parliament

Former federal electoral districts of Quebec